Weston Field may refer to any of several Fields 

 Weston Field (Scranton), a community facility in Scranton, Pennsylvania
 Weston Field (Williamstown), a stadium in Williamstown, Massachusetts